Oleg Gorobiy, born 7 February 1971 in Voronezh) is a Russian sprint canoer who competed from 1990 to 2003. Competing in three Summer Olympics, he won a bronze medal in the K-4 1000 m event at Atlanta in 1996.

Gorobiy won thirteen medals at the ICF Canoe Sprint World Championships with seven golds (K-4 200 m: 1994, 1997; K-4 500 m: 1990, 1993, 1994, 1995; K-4 1000 m: 1994), a silver (K-4 200 m: 1995), and five bronzes (K-4 200 m: 1999, K-4 500 m: 1991, 2003; K-4 1000 m: 1993, 2001).

In 2004 he joined the national Dragon boat squad as a helmsman, winning four gold medals at the 2004 European championships at Stockton-on-Tees, England.

Height: 1.91 m (6'3"), race weight: 94 kg (207 lbs).

References

External links
 
 

1971 births
Living people
Russian male canoeists
Soviet male canoeists
Olympic canoeists of the Unified Team
Olympic canoeists of Russia
Olympic bronze medalists for Russia
Olympic medalists in canoeing
Canoeists at the 1992 Summer Olympics
Canoeists at the 1996 Summer Olympics
Canoeists at the 2000 Summer Olympics
Medalists at the 1996 Summer Olympics
ICF Canoe Sprint World Championships medalists in kayak
Sportspeople from Voronezh